Krajna Vas is a village in the Municipality of Sežana in the Littoral region of Slovenia, close to the border with Italy.

The church in the settlement is dedicated to Saint Agnes and belongs to the Parish of Skopo.

References

External links
Krajna Vas in Geopedia

Populated places in the Municipality of Sežana